John Heathcote (23 January 1934 – 23 June 2008) was an Australian rules footballer in the Victorian Football League.

Heathcote made his debut for the Carlton Football Club in the Round 2 of the 1958 season. He left the club at the end of the 1962 season.

References

External links
 John Heathcote at Blueseum
 
 

Australian rules footballers from Tasmania
Carlton Football Club players
Burnie Football Club players
Ulverstone Football Club players
Tasmanian Football Hall of Fame inductees
1934 births
2008 deaths